Maheshpur (literally, "the city of Mahesh")  may refer to any of the following places:

Bangladesh
Maheshpur Upazila, Jhenaidah, Khulna

India
Maheshpur, Bihar, a village in Champaran
Maheshpur, Lakhisarai district, a village in Bihar
Maheshpur, Munger, a village in Bihar
Maheshpur block, Jharkhand
Maheshpur Raj, Jharkhand
Maheshpur, Pakur, a village in Jharkhand
Maheshpur, Malda, a village in West Bengal

Nepal
Maheshpur, Mechi
Maheshpur, Narayani
 Maheshpur Gamharia
 Maheshpur Patari

See also 
 Maheshpur (Vidhan Sabha constituency)